The Church of the Assumption of the Blessed Virgin Mary is a Catholic parish church in Tuczno, Poland.

Location

It is in Tuczno, in the Wałcz County, in West Pomeranian Voivodeship.

It belongs to the Deanery Mirosławiec in the Roman Catholic Diocese of Koszalin-Kołobrzeg.

Formerly the see of the Apostolic Administration of Tütz.

Construction

The church was built 1522. The foundations were expanded after 1640.

Accidents

The tower collapsed in 1636, and there was a fire in 1640.

History

It is a temple built in the style of late Gothic architecture in the year 1522, but was rebuilt many times.

The inside

Inside the church is a starry vault, supported by massive pillars. The main altar has the image of the Coronation of the Blessed Virgin Mary, in the aisle is a Pietà of wood from the beginning of the 16th century. The organ is Baroque and from the mid-17th century. Two bells are from 1923, one from 1911

The baptismal font is made of stone

References

External links and references

On the church (in Polish, had translated)
Another Polish reference
An English reference
Some photos
Google maps

Tuczno